Pál Tomori (c. 1475 – 29 August 1526) was a Catholic monk and archbishop of Kalocsa, Hungary. He defeated an Ottoman army near Sremska Mitrovica in 1523.

Pál Tomori was elected commander-in-chief (jointly with György Szapolyai) of the Hungarian army in the battle of Mohács in 1526. He died there while trying to stop fleeing soldiers.

Life
He was born into a common family in Abaúj County. He began his military career as the noble family of János Bornemisza. In Transylvania he was a Curian clerk, treasury official, ispán of the Salt Chamber, and from 1505 to 1514 he was a castle lord in Fogaras.  In 1506 he contributed to the suppression of the Szekler uprising that broke out due to a tax called the ox roasting.  In 1512 II. He was in the Turkish court as Ulászló's ambassador.  At the end of July 1514, after György Dózsa laid down his arms, János Szapolyai sent him against the peasant army besieging the city of Bihor.  In the battle of Tomori, he defeated the insurgents and their leader, and also captured Lőrinc Mészáros.  The Hungarian peasant war of 1514 ended with this battle.
From 1514 to 1518 he was a castle captain in Fogaras (present-day Făgăraș) and Munkács (present-day Mukachevo), then in 1518 he was appointed captain of the castle in Buda.  In May 1519, his action was due to the suppression of the commonplace rebellion in the palatine election parliament.  In the middle of 1520, for unknown reasons - there is an assumption that due to the death of his bride [2] - he distributed his wealth among his relatives, entered the Order of Friars Minor (the Observant Franciscans) and marched to the convent of Esztergom.
Tomori was known as a good soldier, so in 1521, at the outbreak of the Turkish-Hungarian war, many saw in him a warlord who would be able to lead the Hungarian armies. According to a report from the Buda administration, the Hungarians did not have trained warlords, because the long peace (only some border military fought permanently, but most of the nobility lived far away from the Ottoman danger zone) “effeminated” them with reality, only Pál Tomori was skilled in the craft of warfare.  However, despite the encouragement, Tomori did not want to return to a secular career. 
Finally, at the request of Hungary, on February 4, 1523, Pope Adrian VI forced him to accept the archdiocese of Kalocsa, and then in April the Assembly of the Estates hastily entrusted him - according to contemporary reporting - with "the country's lieutenant and the captaincy of the entire Great Plain".  Tomori complied with the instructions of the pope and the Assembly and thus became the organizer and military leader of the defense against the Turks.  During its three years of operation in the South, it has earned serious merits in strengthening border protection.  He arrived at his station in Pétervárad (present-day Petrovaradin) in July 1523, and by August he had to fight the Bosnian pasha Ferhád, who, under the leadership of his army of about twelve thousand men, besieged the castle of Red in Szerém (Syrmia).  On August 6 and 7, Hungarian troops won a decisive victory over Ferhád's army in three battles in the Nagyolaszi-Rednek-Szávaszentdemeter triangle.
This was the only significant Hungarian victory in the Hungarian-Turkish war of 1521–26.  Over the next year and a half, Tomori sought to strengthen the southern border fortress system, especially the one in Szerém. Relying on these castles, he repulsed the increasing frequency of Turkish invasions.  By 1525, he had stabilized the situation so much that he was able to break into Turkish territory as well.  He could not think of a larger campaign, because he received very little support from the Hungarian Treasury and the Hungarian lords.  The diocese of Tomori spent all its income on defense and also received papal support, but this proved to be small in relation to the task.
To make the court and the lords aware of the danger, he repeatedly threatened to resign, then on January 12, 1526, he actually submitted his resignation and began negotiations with the Turkish ambassador who detained in Buda.  Later, Suleiman the Magnificent had already decided to launch another campaign against Hungary, so Tomori withdrew his resignation and returned to his station again.  His plan was to try to stop the Turkish army on the Drava line with an army of about six thousand.  On August 24, he also defeated a Turkish protégé, but the military council ordered his army to join the Hungarian main army.  Tomori opposed the decision, but carried out the order nonetheless.  In the battle on August 29, he was the commander-in-chief of the Hungarian armies.  In addition to many ecclesiastical and secular dignities, he also lost his life in the short battle.

Legends
Many legends and stories exist about him. These include that his wife was killed, causing him to become a monk, and that he only became archbishop due to the pressure of his king, but refused to wear anything but his armour and the monk's cowl.

References

1475 births
1526 deaths
16th-century Roman Catholic archbishops in Hungary
Archbishops of Kalocsa
Hungarian Christian monks
Hungarian generals
Hungarian nobility